Karl Prachar (1924 – November 27, 1994) was am Austrian mathematician who worked in the area of analytic number theory. He is known for his much acclaimed book on the distribution of the prime numbers, Primzahlverteilung (Springer Verlag, 1957).

Prachar received his doctorate in 1947 from the University of Vienna.

References

Number theorists
1924 births
1994 deaths
20th-century  Austrian mathematicians
Burials at Ottakring Cemetery